Castel de Cabra is a municipality in Cuencas Mineras, province of Teruel, Aragon, Spain. According to the 2010 census the municipality has a population of 140 inhabitants. Its postal code is 44706.

The town is located on the northern side of Sierra de San Just. Road N-211 crosses Castel de Cabra.

See also
Cuencas Mineras
List of municipalities in Teruel

References

External links 

 Castel de Cabra, CAI Aragon

Municipalities in the Province of Teruel